Cul-De-Sac Conquest is a dedicated deck card game  developed by Atheris Games where players choose a character and compete to annoy one another. The game was created by Andrew and Colby Birkett.

Development 
The game was funded through a successful Kickstarter campaign. The game was one of several products that got stranded at sea during the Hanjin bankruptcy.

Reviews 

 Board Game Geek
 All Us Geeks
 WUFT Gainesville
 SmarterBacker

External links 
 Official Site

References

Dedicated deck card games